Chrysolite may refer to:
 Peridot, a gem-quality olivine
 Archaically, any of several green or yellow-green-coloured gemstones including
 Topaz, a silicate mineral of aluminium and fluorine
 Chrysoberyl, an aluminate of beryllium
 Zircon, a mineral belonging to the group of nesosilicates
 Tourmaline, a crystalline boron silicate mineral compounded with other elements
 Apatite, a group of phosphate minerals

See also